Steven Chungu (born 22 July 1969) is a Zambian Olympic boxer. He represented his country in the featherweight division at the 1992 Summer Olympics. He won his first bout against Paul Griffin, and then lost his second bout to Victoriano Damian.

References

1969 births
Living people
Zambian male boxers
Olympic boxers of Zambia
Boxers at the 1992 Summer Olympics
Featherweight boxers